In mathematics, the Coble variety is the moduli space of ordered sets of 6 points in the projective plane, and can be represented as a double cover of the projective 4-space branched over the Igusa quartic. It is a 4-dimensional variety that was first studied by Arthur Coble.

See also
 Coble curve
 Coble surface
 Coble hypersurface

References

Algebraic varieties